Uno Palu (born 8 February 1933 in Sindi) is a former Estonian decathlete who represented the USSR. He trained at Dynamo in Tallinn.

At the 1956 Summer Olympics he finished fourth in decathlon. He won a silver medal at the 1958 European Championships.

References

1933 births
Living people
People from Sindi, Estonia
Soviet decathletes
Estonian decathletes
Dynamo sports society athletes
Athletes (track and field) at the 1956 Summer Olympics
Olympic athletes of the Soviet Union
European Athletics Championships medalists